The Clare Intermediate Hurling Championship is an annual hurling competition organised by the Clare County Board of the Gaelic Athletic Association for the second tier hurling teams in the county of Clare in Ireland.

The series of games are played during the summer and autumn months with the county final currently being played at Cusack Park. The championship includes a group stage which is followed by a knock-out phase for the top teams. There is also promotion involving the Clare Senior Hurling Championship and relegation involving the Clare Junior Hurling Championship.

In 2012 it was decided that from 2014 onwards the Clare Senior Hurling Championship would become a single sixteen team championship. This meant that five clubs would lose their senior status and be relegated down to intermediate. However due to the overwhelming success of both the Clare Senior and Under-21 inter-county squads in 2013, the culling of the senior hurling championship was postponed for twelve months. 2014 saw the relegation of Broadford, Doora-Barefield, Ruan, Scariff and Wolfe Tones down to intermediate for the 2015 season.

The 2022 Intermediate Champions are St. Joseph's, Doora-Barefield who defeated Tulla by 0-23 to 1-15 after extra time to win their fourth title at this grade and return to senior ranks for 2023.

Roll Of Honour

 When Ennis Dalcassians won the 1943 Clare Junior Football Championship, they offered an opportunity to players from fellow junior club, Doora-Barefield, to join with them and enter the Clare Senior Football Championship as the Ennis Faughs. They went on to win four senior football titles in 1947, 1948, 1952 and 1954. The Ennis Faughs also won the 1946 Clare Intermediate Football Championship, and the 1945 Clare Intermediate Hurling Championship. The Ennis Faughs disbanded in 1956.

See also
 Clare Senior Hurling Championship
 Clare Junior A Hurling Championship
 Clare Under-21 A Hurling Championship

References

Hurling competitions in County Clare
Intermediate hurling county championships